Havens may refer to:

People
 Beckwith Havens (1890–1969), American aviator
 Bob Havens (born 1930), American big band and jazz musician
 Brad Havens (born 1959), American baseball player
 Charlie Havens (1903–1996), American football player
 Frank C. Havens 1848–1918, American lawyer 
 Frank Havens (canoeist) (1924–2018), American sprint canoeist
 George Remington Havens (1890–1977), American professor
 Harrison E. Havens (1837–1916), American lawyer and politician
 J. Havens Richards (1851–1923), American Jesuit educator
 James D. Havens (1900–1960), American printmaker and painter 
 James S. Havens (1859–1927), American politician
 Jeb Havens, American video game developer
 John Havens (born 1956/1957), American businessman
 Jonathan Nicoll Havens (1757–1799), American politician
 Kayri Havens, American botanist
 Leston Havens (1924–2011), American psychiatrist, psychotherapist and medical educator
 Nol Havens, lead singer of VOF de Kunst
 Palmer E. Havens (1818–1886), American politician
 Ralph Havens (born 1943), American luger
 Reese Havens (born 1986), American baseball player 
 Richie Havens (1941–2013), American singer-songwriter and guitarist
Richard P. Havens, 1983, a music album
 Thomas Havens (born 1939), American Japanologist
 William Havens (1919–2013), American canoeist
 William W. Havens Jr. (1920–2004), an American physicist

Places
 Havens, Nebraska, U.S.
 Havens, Ohio, U.S.
 Havens Wildlife Management Area, Roanoke County, Virginia, U.S.
 The Havens, in Pembrokeshire, Wales

Other uses
 Havens (department store), in Westcliff-on-Sea, Essex, England
 Havens (typeface), from the Inland Type Foundry

See also

 Haven (disambiguation)
 Havers (disambiguation)